She's Oil Mine is the last short subject American comedian Buster Keaton made for Columbia Pictures. Keaton made a total of 10 films for the studio between 1939 and 1941.

Plot
Keaton and Monte Collins appear as Waters and Piper, plumbers. During a busy day in their shop, an heiress (Elsie Ames) flees from a persistent suitor (Eddie Laughton). The jealous suitor challenges Keaton to a duel.

Background
The film is a reworking of Keaton's 1932 feature The Passionate Plumber. The duel was also reworked in Keaton's 1947 French short Un Duel A Mort.

After making 10 shorts for Columbia, Keaton chose not to renew his contract and opted for supporting roles in feature films. Columbia continued to offer the Keaton comedies to theaters well into the 1960s.

External links

She's Oil Mine at the International Buster Keaton Society

1941 films
1941 comedy films
Columbia Pictures short films
American black-and-white films
Films directed by Jules White
American comedy short films
1940s English-language films
1940s American films